The following highways are numbered 680.

Canada
 Alberta Highway 680
Saskatchewan Highway 680

United States
  Interstate 680
  California State Route 680 (former)
  Ohio State Route 680 (1930s-1960s) (former)

Territories
  Puerto Rico Highway 680

680